The network model is a database model.

The term may also refer to:
Network topology
Packet generation model
Channel model
Døde Sønderborg